Saint Bartlett is Damien Jurado's ninth studio album. It was released in May 2010 by Secretly Canadian.

Track listing 
 "Cloudy Shoes"
 "Arkansas"
 "Rachel & Cali"
 "Throwing Your Voice"
 "Wallingford"
 "Pear"
 "Kansas City"
 "Harborview"
 "Kalama"
 "The Falling Snow"
 "Beacon Hill"
 "With Lightning In Your Hands"

Our Turn to Shine
Some Independent Music stores in the USA and UK and Amazon UK sold the album with a 5-track bonus EP called Our Turn to Shine
"Josephine"
"Everyone a Star"
"Three to Be Seen"
"Wyoming Birds"
"You for a While"

References

2010 albums
Secretly Canadian albums
Damien Jurado albums
Albums produced by Richard Swift (singer-songwriter)